Bingham Township is a civil township of Huron County in the U.S. state of Michigan.  As of the 2000 census, the township population was 1,751. The township is named for Kinsley S. Bingham, a U.S. Representative and U.S. Senator from and Governor of Michigan.

History
Bingham Township was established in 1863.

Communities
The village of Ubly is within the township on M-19.

Geography

Demographics
As of the census of 2000, there were 1,751 people, 680 households, and 480 families residing in the township. There were 721 housing units at an average density of 20.1 per square mile (7.8/km2). The racial makeup of the township was 99.03% White, 0.11% African American, 0.06% Native American, 0.11% Asian, 0.17% from other races, and 0.51% from two or more races. Hispanic or Latino of any race were 0.46% of the population.

There were 680 households, out of which 34.0% had children under the age of 18 living with them, 59.9% were married couples living together, 7.9% had a female householder with no husband present, and 29.3% were non-families. 26.2% of all households were made up of individuals, and 11.5% had someone living alone who was 65 years of age or older.  The average household size was 2.55 and the average family size was 3.10.

In the township the population was spread out, with 28.1% under the age of 18, 6.3% from 18 to 24, 30.0% from 25 to 44, 21.5% from 45 to 64, and 14.1% who were 65 years of age or older.  The median age was 36 years. For every 100 females, there were 99.2 males.  For every 100 females age 18 and over, there were 97.0 males.

The median income for a household in the township was $37,102, and the median income for a family was $49,205. Males had a median income of $31,016 versus $21,515 for females. The per capita income for the township was $17,916.  About 6.8% of families and 10.5% of the population were below the poverty line, including 10.2% of those under age 18 and 11.9% of those age 65 or over.

References

Notes

Sources

Townships in Huron County, Michigan
1863 establishments in Michigan
Townships in Michigan